Saxo-fridericia is a group of plants in the family Rapateaceae described as a genus in 1845.

The genus is native to northern South America.

 Species
 Saxo-fridericia aculeata Körn - N Brazil (Amapá, Amazonas), SE Colombia, Guyana, French Guiana, Suriname
 Saxo-fridericia compressa Maguire - Venezuela (Amazonas), Brazil (Amazonas)
 Saxo-fridericia duidae Maguire - Venezuela (Amazonas)
 Saxo-fridericia grandis Maguire - Venezuela (Amazonas)
 Saxo-fridericia inermis Ducke - Brazil (Amazonas), Venezuela (Amazonas), Colombia (Guainía)
 Saxo-fridericia petiolata Maguire - Venezuela (Amazonas)
 Saxo-fridericia regalis R.H.Schomb. - Roraima, Venezuela (Bolívar, Amazonas), Guyana
 Saxo-fridericia spongiosa Maguire - Venezuela (Amazonas), Brazil (Amazonas)

References

Poales genera
Rapateaceae